"Si Tú La Quieres" (Spanish for "If You Love Her") is a song recorded by Spanish singer David Bisbal for his seventh studio album En Tus Planes (2020). A fan favorite, the song was remixed and released as a single on April 3, 2020 through Universal Music this time featuring Spanish singer Aitana. The track was certified Gold in Spain for selling over 20,000 copies on May 12.

Background 
Bisbal and Aitana began interacting in Spring 2018 after the ninth series of Operación Triunfo had come to an end. Since they are both the runner-ups of the show (Bisbal in 2001 and Aitana in 2017), he invited her to perform at one of his sold-out concerts at the Palau Sant Jordi, Spain's largest indoor arena. They have had a close friendly relationship since that moment. During that period they started negotiations to collaborate musically talking. The collaboration was announced on March 30, 2020 through their respective social media profiles as well as the single's cover art. A snippet of the song was released the day after. The release of the cover art caused major controversy because of its low quality and lack of attractiveness. Critics and consumers even compared it to a "porn website banner".

Music video 
The music video for "Si Tú La Quieres" was scheduled to be filmed in mid-March in Medellín, Colombia but got cancelled because of Spain's national quarantine caused by the coronavirus pandemic beginning on March 15, 2020. Since the single's radio impact and release was already programmed, the singers improvised a homemade music video filled with images of doctors and nurses dancing around hospitals in order to make it a tribute to Spain's health workers. The video was released on YouTube on April 2, receiving over 10 million views in its first week.

Charts

Weekly charts

Year-end charts

Certifications

Release history

References 

2020 singles
David Bisbal songs
Aitana (singer) songs
2020 songs